Lipovec pri Kostelu is a small remote settlement west of Kostel in southern Slovenia. The area is part of the traditional region of Lower Carniola and is now included in the Southeast Slovenia Statistical Region.

Name
The name of the settlement was changed from Lipovec to Lipovec pri Kostelu in 1955.

References

External links
Lipovec pri Kostelu on Geopedia

Populated places in the Municipality of Kostel